This is a list of years in Somaliland. For only articles about years in Somaliland that have been written, see :Category:Years in Somaliland.

Colonisation 
Decades: 1880s ·
1890s ·
1900s ·
1910s ·
1920s ·
1930s ·
1940s ·
1950s

20th century 
Decades: 1960s ·
1970s ·
1980s ·
1990s

21st century

See also 

 
Somaliland history-related lists
Somaliland